The 2017 US Open was the 137th edition of tennis' US Open and the fourth and final Grand Slam event of the year. It was held on outdoor hard courts at the USTA Billie Jean King National Tennis Center in New York City. Experimental rules featured in qualifying for the main draw as well as in the junior, wheelchair and exhibition events.

Stan Wawrinka and Angelique Kerber were the previous year's men's and women's singles champions. Neither managed to defend their title as Wawrinka withdrew before the start of the tournament due to a knee injury that ended his season, while Kerber lost in the first round to Naomi Osaka.

The men's singles tournament concluded with Rafael Nadal defeating Kevin Anderson in the final, while the women's singles tournament concluded with Sloane Stephens defeating Madison Keys in the final.

Tournament

The 2017 US Open was the 137th edition of the tournament and took place at the USTA Billie Jean King National Tennis Center in Flushing Meadows–Corona Park of Queens in New York City, New York, United States. The tournament was held on 15 DecoTurf hard courts.

The tournament was an event run by the International Tennis Federation (ITF) and was part of the 2017 ATP World Tour and the 2017 WTA Tour calendars under the Grand Slam category. The tournament consisted of both men's and women's singles and doubles draws as well as a mixed doubles event. There were also singles and doubles events for both boys and girls (players under 18), which were part of the Grade A category of tournaments. Additionally, there were singles and doubles wheelchair tennis events for men, women and quads.

The 2017 tournament saw the USTA try out two experimental rules. Firstly, the USTA introduced a shot clock to combat slow play and to address players going over the allotted time for warm ups and medical time outs. Secondly, coaching was allowed from the side of the court. Whilst a player was at the same end as their box they could verbally communicate, if they were at the opposite end then sign language would be allowed. This meant that coaching incidents involving Victoria Azarenka and Caroline Garcia at Wimbledon would have been allowed. The rules only applied in qualifying matches for the main draw, junior, wheelchair and legends matches.

The tournament was played on hard courts and took place over a series of 15 courts with DecoTurf surface, including the two existing main showcourts – Arthur Ashe Stadium and the new Grandstand. Louis Armstrong Stadium, one of the main stadiums used in the previous tournament, was demolished after the 2016 tournament and was replaced for the 2017 edition by a temporary stadium located next to parking lot B near the construction of the previous Louis Armstrong Stadium site.

Broadcast
In the United States, the 2017 US Open will be the third year in a row under an 11-year, $825 million contract with ESPN, in which the broadcaster holds exclusive rights to the entire tournament and the US Open Series. This means that the tournament is not available on broadcast television. This also makes ESPN the exclusive U.S. broadcaster for three of the four tennis majors. In Australia, SBS won the rights to broadcast the US Open with the free to air coverage starting from the quarter finals.

Américas 

 Latin America: ESPN 
 : ESPN and TyC Sports 
 : ESPN and SporTV 
 : ESPN and Tigo Sports 
 : ESPN and

Point and prize money distribution

Point distribution
Below is a series of tables for each of the competitions showing the ranking points on offer for each event.

Senior

Wheelchair

Junior

Prize money
The total prize-money compensation for the 2017 US Open is $50.4 million, a 3.7% increase on the same total last year. Of that total, a record $3.7 million goes to both the men's and women's singles champions, which is increased to 7.5 percent from last year. This made the US Open the most lucrative and highest paying tennis grand slam in the world, leapfrogging Wimbledon in total prize money fund. Prize money for the US Open qualifying tournament is also up 49.2 percent, to $2.9 million. The total prize money for the wheelchair tennis events was $200,000.

Singles players 
Men's singles

Women's singles

Day-by-day summaries

Doubles seeds

Men's doubles

1Rankings as of August 21, 2017.

Women's doubles

1Rankings as of August 21, 2017.

Mixed doubles

1Rankings as of August 21, 2017.

Events

Men's singles

 Rafael Nadal def.  Kevin Anderson, 6–3, 6–3, 6–4

Women's singles

  Sloane Stephens def.  Madison Keys, 6–3, 6–0

Men's doubles

  Jean-Julien Rojer /  Horia Tecău def.  Feliciano López /  Marc López, 6–4, 6–3

Women's doubles

  Chan Yung-jan /  Martina Hingis def.  Lucie Hradecká /  Kateřina Siniaková, 6–3, 6–2

Mixed doubles

  Martina Hingis /  Jamie Murray def.  Chan Hao-ching /  Michael Venus, 6–1, 4–6, [10–8]

Junior boys' singles

  Wu Yibing def.  Axel Geller, 6–4, 6–4

Junior girls' singles

  Amanda Anisimova def.  Coco Gauff, 6–0, 6–2

Junior boys' doubles

  Hsu Yu-hsiou /  Wu Yibing def.  Toru Horie /  Yuta Shimizu, 6–4, 5–7, [11–9]

Junior girls' doubles

  Olga Danilović /  Marta Kostyuk def.  Lea Bošković /  Wang Xiyu, 6–1, 7–5

Men's champions doubles

  John McEnroe /  Patrick McEnroe def.  Pat Cash /  Henri Leconte, 6–2, 6–4

Women's champions doubles

  Kim Clijsters /  Martina Navratilova def.  Lindsay Davenport /  Mary Joe Fernández, 4–6, 6–2, [10–4]

Wheelchair men's singles

  Stéphane Houdet def.  Alfie Hewett, 6–2, 4–6, 6–3

Wheelchair women's singles

  Yui Kamiji def.  Diede de Groot, 7–5, 6–2

Wheelchair quad singles

  David Wagner def.  Andrew Lapthorne, 7–5, 3–6, 6–4

Wheelchair men's doubles

  Alfie Hewett /  Gordon Reid def.  Stéphane Houdet /  Nicolas Peifer, 7–5, 6–4

Wheelchair women's doubles

  Marjolein Buis /  Diede de Groot def.  Dana Mathewson /  Aniek van Koot, 6–4, 6–3

Wheelchair quad doubles

  Andrew Lapthorne /  David Wagner def.  Dylan Alcott /  Bryan Barten, 7–5, 6–2

Wild card entries
The following players were given wildcards to the main draw based on internal selection and recent performances.

Men's doubles
  William Blumberg /  Spencer Papa
  Christopher Eubanks /  Christian Harrison
  Taylor Fritz /  Reilly Opelka
  Steve Johnson /  Tommy Paul
  Vasil Kirkov /  Danny Thomas
  Bradley Klahn /  Scott Lipsky
  Austin Krajicek /  Jackson Withrow

Women's doubles
  Kristie Ahn /  Irina Falconi
  Amanda Anisimova /  Emina Bektas
  Julia Boserup /  Nicole Gibbs
  Jacqueline Cako /  Sachia Vickery
  Kayla Day /  Caroline Dolehide
  Francesca Di Lorenzo /  Allie Kiick
  Taylor Johnson /  Claire Liu

Mixed doubles
  Kristie Ahn /  Tennys Sandgren
  Amanda Anisimova /  Christian Harrison
  Jennifer Brady /  Bjorn Fratangelo
  Louisa Chirico /  Bradley Klahn
  Liezel Huber /  Danny Thomas
  Sofia Kenin /  Michael Mmoh
  Jamie Loeb /  Mitchell Krueger
  Nicole Melichar /  Jackson Withrow

References

External links

 
 

 
2017 ATP World Tour
2017 in tennis
2017 US Open (tennis)
2017 WTA Tour
2017
August 2017 sports events in the United States
September 2017 sports events in the United States
2017 in American tennis
2017 in sports in New York City